The twentieth season of the American competitive reality television series Hell's Kitchen (subtitled as Hell's Kitchen: Young Guns) premiered on Fox on May 31, 2021, and concluded on September 13, 2021. Gordon Ramsay returned as host and head chef, while season 10 winner Christina Wilson returned to serve as red team sous-chef and season seven runner-up Jason Santos returned to serve as blue team sous-chef.

The season was won by executive chef Trenton Garvey, with line cook Megan Gill finishing second and head chef Kiya Willhelm placing third.

Production
On February 26, 2019, it was announced that the series had been renewed for a nineteenth and twentieth season. Both seasons were filmed in 2019 (prior to the COVID-19 pandemic) at a television studio a short distance from the actual Hell's Kitchen restaurant in Las Vegas, Nevada. On April 7, 2021, it was announced that the twentieth season would premiere on May 31, 2021.

Chefs
Eighteen chefs competed in season 20, with all of them aged 24 years old or younger.

Contestant progress

Episodes

References 

Hell's Kitchen (American TV series)
2021 American television seasons